William James Dafoe (born July 22, 1955) is an American actor. He is the recipient of various accolades, including the Volpi Cup for Best Actor, in addition to receiving nominations for four Academy Awards, four Screen Actors Guild Awards, three Golden Globe Awards, and a BAFTA. He has frequently collaborated with filmmakers Paul Schrader, Abel Ferrara, Lars von Trier, Julian Schnabel, Wes Anderson, and Robert Eggers. 

Dafoe was an early member of experimental theater company The Wooster Group. He made his film debut in Heaven's Gate (1980), but was fired during production. He had his first leading role in the outlaw biker film The Loveless (1982). Early roles include in Streets of Fire (1984) and To Live and Die in L.A. (1985) before breakthrough roles in The Last Temptation of Christ and Mississippi Burning both in 1988. 

Dafoe received his first Academy Award nomination for Best Supporting Actor for Oliver Stone's war film Platoon (1986). Other Oscar-nominated films include Shadow of the Vampire (2000), The Florida Project (2017), and At Eternity's Gate (2018). Notable roles include in The English Patient (1996), American Psycho (2000), The Life Aquatic with Steve Zissou (2004), Antichrist (2009), John Wick (2014), The Grand Budapest Hotel (2014),  Murder on the Orient Express (2017), The Lighthouse (2019), The French Dispatch (2021), Nightmare Alley (2021), and The Northman (2022).

Dafoe gained wider attention for his role as the supervillain Norman Osborn / Green Goblin in the superhero film Spider-Man (2002), a role he reprised in its sequels Spider-Man 2 (2004) and Spider-Man 3 (2007), and the Marvel Cinematic Universe film Spider-Man: No Way Home (2021). He also portrayed Nuidis Vulko in the DC Extended Universe films Aquaman (2018), Zack Snyder's Justice League (2021) and the upcoming Aquaman and the Lost Kingdom (2023).

Early life and education

William James Dafoe was born on July 22, 1955, in Appleton, Wisconsin. One of eight children of Muriel Isabel (née Sprissler) (November 29, 1921 – September 14, 2012) and Dr. William Alfred Dafoe (July 21, 1917 – November 21, 2014), he recalled in 2009: "My five sisters raised me because my father was a surgeon, my mother was a nurse and they worked together, so I didn't see either of them much." His brother, Donald Dafoe, is a transplant surgeon and researcher. He has English, French, German, Irish, and Scottish ancestry. His surname, Dafoe, is the Anglicized version of the Swiss Thévou.  During an interview he explained that about half of the Dafoe family puts the emphasis on the first syllable of their surname, and the other half on the second.  In high school, he acquired the nickname Willem, which is the Dutch version of the name William. Only after becoming an actor did he take the second interpretation as his stage name.

After attending Appleton East High School, Dafoe studied drama at the University of Wisconsin–Milwaukee, but left after a year and a half to join the experimental theater company Theatre X in Milwaukee, Wisconsin, before moving to New York City in 1976. There he apprenticed under Richard Schechner, director of the avant-garde theater troupe The Performance Group, where he met and became romantically involved with Elizabeth LeCompte. She, with her former romantic partner Spalding Gray and others, edged out Schechner and created the Wooster Group. Within a year Dafoe was part of the company. Dafoe would continue with the Wooster Group into the 2000s. On May 22, 2022, Dafoe was invited back to the University of Wisconsin-Milwaukee by Chancellor Mark Mone to serve as the keynote speaker for the University's commencement ceremony and to receive an honorary Doctor of Arts degree.

Career

1980s
Dafoe began his film career in 1979, when he was cast in a supporting role in Michael Cimino's epic Western film Heaven's Gate. Dafoe was only present for the first three months of an eight-month shoot. His role, that of a cockfighter who works for Jeff Bridges' character, was removed from a majority of the film during editing but was visible during a cockfight scene. Dafoe did not receive a credit for his work on the film. In 1982, Dafoe starred as the leader of an outlaw motorcycle club in the drama The Loveless, his first role as a leading man. The film was co-directed by Kathryn Bigelow and Monty Montgomery and paid homage to 1953 film The Wild One, starring Marlon Brando in a similar role.

Following a brief appearance in the horror film The Hunger (1983), Dafoe again played the leader of a biker gang in Walter Hill's 1984 action film Streets of Fire. His character in the film served as the main antagonist, who captures the ex-girlfriend of a mercenary, played by Diane Lane and Michael Paré, respectively. Janet Maslin of The New York Times felt there were no great performances in the film, but praised Dafoe's "perfectly villainous" face. Dafoe starred alongside Judge Reinhold in Roadhouse 66 (1985) as a pair of yuppies who become stranded in a town on U.S. Route 66. Later in 1985, Dafoe starred with William Petersen and John Pankow in William Friedkin's thriller To Live and Die in L.A., in which Dafoe portrays a counterfeiter named Rick Masters who is being tracked by two Secret Service agents. Film critic Roger Ebert commended his "strong" performance in the film.

Dafoe's sole film release of 1986 was Oliver Stone's Vietnam War film Platoon, gaining him his widest exposure up to that point for playing the compassionate Sergeant Elias Grodin. He enjoyed the opportunity to play a heroic role and said the film gave him a chance to display his versatility, saying "I think all characters live in you. You just frame them, give them circumstances, and that character will happen." Principal photography for the film took place in the Philippines and required Dafoe to undergo boot camp training. Los Angeles Times writer Sheila Benson praised his performance and found it to be "particularly fine" to see Dafoe play "something other than a psychopath". At the 59th Academy Awards, Dafoe was nominated for the Academy Award for Best Supporting Actor, but the statuette was awarded to Michael Caine (for the 1986 film Hannah and Her Sisters). Dafoe provided his voice to the documentary Dear America: Letters Home from Vietnam (1987) and, in 1988, Dafoe starred in another film set during the Vietnam War, this time as Criminal Investigation Command Agent Buck McGriff in the action thriller Off Limits. His second release of 1988 was Martin Scorsese's epic drama The Last Temptation of Christ, in which Dafoe portrayed Jesus. The film was adapted from the novel of the same name and depicts his struggle with various forms of temptation throughout his life. Like the novel, the film sparked controversy for departing from the biblical portrayal of Jesus and was branded as being blasphemous. Dafoe's performance in the film was widely praised, however, with Janet Maslin opining that Dafoe brought a "gleaming intensity" to the role.

In his final release of 1988, Dafoe starred opposite Gene Hackman in the crime thriller Mississippi Burning as a pair of FBI agents investigating the disappearance of three civil rights workers in fictional Jessup County, Mississippi during the civil rights movement. Variety praised Dafoe's performance, writing, "Dafoe gives a disciplined and noteworthy portrayal of Ward", although they felt it was Hackman "who steals the picture". As with The Last Temptation of Christ, the film was the subject of controversy, this time among African-American activists who criticized its fictionalization of events. Dafoe was briefly considered for the role of the super-villain the Joker in the Tim Burton-directed superhero film Batman (1989), as screenwriter Sam Hamm noticed physical similarities, but was never offered the part that eventually went to Jack Nicholson. Dafoe starred in the drama Triumph of the Spirit in 1989 as Jewish Greek boxer Salamo Arouch, an Auschwitz concentration camp inmate who was forced to fight other internees to death for the Nazi officers' entertainment. It was filmed on location at Auschwitz, the first major film to do so. While the film was negatively received, Dafoe's performance was lauded by some critics; Peter Travers of Rolling Stone felt he gave a "disciplined performance" and Janet Maslin thought he was "harrowingly good". Dafoe reunited with Platoon director Oliver Stone for a small appearance in the biographical war drama Born on the Fourth of July (1989). Dafoe played a paraplegic, wheelchair-using Vietnam veteran who befriends the film's subject Ron Kovic (played by Tom Cruise), another paraplegic veteran.

1990s
Dafoe made a cameo appearance in John Waters' musical comedy Cry-Baby (1990) as a prison guard who gives a brief lecture on values to the title character, who is played by Johnny Depp. Rita Kempley of The Washington Post found the scene to be one of the film's highlights. In the same year, Dafoe co-starred in David Lynch's crime film Wild at Heart with Nicolas Cage and Laura Dern. Dafoe played a criminal who engages in a robbery with Cage's character before demonstrating his dark side. He wore fake, corroded teeth and grew a pencil moustache that bore resemblance to his previous collaborator, John Waters. Entertainment Weekly critic Owen Gleiberman felt the role proved Dafoe as a "master of leering, fish-faced villainy". In 1991, Dafoe starred with Danny Glover and Brad Johnson in the action film Flight of the Intruder. The film follows a pair of United States Navy pilots, played by Dafoe and Johnson, who scheme and participate in an unauthorized air strike on Hanoi. Directed by John Millius, the film received negative reviews. He was due to star opposite Joan Cusack in the comedy Arrive Alive in 1991, but the film was canceled during production. Dafoe had two lead roles in 1992. The first to be released, White Sands, saw Dafoe a play small-town sheriff who impersonates a dead man after finding his dead body and a suitcase containing $500,000 to solve the case, resulting in an FBI investigation. In his next starring role, Paul Schrader's drama Light Sleeper, Dafoe played John LeTour, a lonely, insomniac, New Yorker working as a delivery man for a drug supplier, who is played by Susan Sarandon. Roger Ebert praised Dafoe's "gifted" portrayal of LeTour and Owen Gleiberman opined that "even when the film doesn't gel, one is held by Willem Dafoe's grimly compelling performance."

Dafoe next starred in the erotic thriller Body of Evidence (1993) with Madonna. The story concerns a lawyer, played by Dafoe, who engages in a sadomasochistic sexual relationship with the woman he is representing in a murder case. The film was panned by critics and performed poorly at the box office, with some audience members laughing during the sex scenes. In his review of the film, Vincent Canby felt that Dafoe lacked sensuality in the role. Later in 1993, Dafoe appeared in a supporting role as Emit Flesti (an anagram of Time Itself) in the German fantasy film Faraway, So Close!, directed by Wim Wenders. Dafoe then co-starred in the spy thriller Clear and Present Danger (1994), an adaptation of the Tom Clancy novel of the name starring Harrison Ford as CIA operative Jack Ryan. Dafoe played John Clark, a CIA agent conducting a covert operation against a drug cartel in Colombia with Jack Ryan. Dafoe portrayed the poet T. S. Eliot in the drama Tom & Viv (also in 1994), which tells the story of Eliot and his first wife, Vivienne Haigh-Wood Eliot, who was played by Miranda Richardson. The film was met with a mixed reception from critics, although Caryn James of The New York Times felt that Dafoe's "stunningly sharp, sympathetic portrait raises the film above a script that is full of serious holes and stilted dialogue". In 1995, he played an 18th-century writer in the period drama The Night and the Moment.

In his first of three film appearances in 1996, Dafoe made a cameo appearance as an electrician in the biographical drama Basquiat. Next, he played a Canadian Intelligence Corps operative in the romantic war drama The English Patient, which starred Ralph Fiennes as desert explorer Count László Almásy. The English Patient was filmed in Tuscany, where Dafoe said he particularly enjoyed the "quiet moments in the monastery between shoots". In the period drama Victory—which was filmed in 1994 and premiered in Europe in 1996, but was not released until 1998—Dafoe played a European living on an island in the Southeast Asia who becomes the target of redemption after preventing a woman, played by Irène Jacob, from being raped. In 1997, Dafoe returned to playing a villainous role in the action thriller Speed 2: Cruise Control, expressing the necessity of appearing in both independent and blockbuster films. The film starred Sandra Bullock and Jason Patric as a couple vacationing on a luxury cruise that has been hijacked by Dafoe's character, Geiger, a hacker that has programmed the ship to crash into an oil tanker. Speed 2 was met with overwhelmingly negative reviews from critics, with Dafoe himself receiving a Razzie Award nomination for Worst Supporting Actor. For his next film, Affliction (1997), Dafoe worked with Paul Schrader for a second time, playing the brother of Nick Nolte's character and served as the film's narrator. Also in 1997, Dafoe took on a voice acting role in an episode of the animated sitcom The Simpsons titled "The Secret War of Lisa Simpson", voicing the commandant of a military academy that Bart and Lisa Simpson are attending. Following a villainous supporting role in the romantic mystery drama Lulu on the Bridge, Dafoe starred alongside Christopher Walken and Asia Argento in Abel Ferrara's cyberpunk drama New Rose Hotel in 1998. It follows X (Dafoe) and Fox (Walken), a pair of corporate raiders attempting to lure a Japanese scientist from one megacorporation to another. Although the film was largely dismissed by critics, critic David Stratton found there to be "compensation" in the performances.

In 1999, Dafoe gave a supporting performance in David Cronenberg's Existenz, a science fiction thriller in which he played a gas station owner named Gas. Later in the year, Dafoe starred in the action film The Boondock Saints. He played an eccentric, gay FBI agent assigned with investigating a series of murders committed by the MacManus twins (played by Sean Patrick Flanery and Norman Reedus) who are acting as vigilantes in Boston, Massachusetts after an act of self-defense. The Boondock Saints was negatively received by film critics, largely for its extreme violence and lack of emotional depth, though some critics praised Dafoe's role in the film. The film performed poorly at the box office, but has since been branded as being a cult film.

2000s

In his first film of the 2000s, Dafoe was featured in a supporting role in American Psycho (2000) as a private investigator investigating the disappearance of a co-worker of Patrick Bateman (played by Christian Bale), an investment banker who leads a double life as a serial killer. His next film of 2000, Steve Buscemi's crime drama Animal Factory, starred as Dafoe an incarcerated veteran con-man who takes a young inmate (played by Edward Furlong) under his wing and introduces to him to his gang. The film was positively received by critics and Elvis Mitchell of The New York Times wrote that "Dafoe steals the picture with his comic timing". Shadow of the Vampire, his final film of the year, saw him portray a fictionalized version of the German actor Max Schreck during the production of the 1922 horror film Nosferatu, in which Schreck starred as the vampire Count Orlok. Dafoe's co-star John Malkovich portrayed the film's director, F. W. Murnau. The film delves into fiction when, over the course of Nosferatus production, the cast and crew come to discover that Schreck is actually a vampire himself. Much of the film's critical praise went to Dafoe; Roger Ebert wrote that Dafoe "embodies the Schreck of Nosferatu so uncannily that when real scenes from the silent classic are slipped into the frame, we don't notice a difference". The Chicago Reader critic Jonathan Rosenbaum opined felt the film's "only redeeming quality" was Dafoe's "enjoyably over-the-top, eye-rolling performance". Dafoe received numerous awards and nominations for his performance, including his second Academy Award for Best Supporting Actor nomination.

Dafoe took on two leading roles in 2001, both of which were as priests. In the drama Pavilion of Women, he played an American priest living in China who falls in love with a local married woman (played by the film's screenwriter Luo Yan) while giving her son a Western education. He then starred opposite Haley Joel Osment in Edges of the Lord, playing a compassionate priest helping a young Jewish boy pose as a Catholic to protect him during Nazi Germany's occupation of Poland. 

Dafoe played the supervillain the Green Goblin in Sam Raimi's 2002 superhero film Spider-Man, starring Tobey Maguire as the titular Marvel Comics superhero. Dafoe played the Norman Osborn incarnation of the Green Goblin, the billionaire founder and owner of the corporation Oscorp, becoming the Green Goblin after testing an unstable strength enhancer on himself, turning him insane and making him extremely powerful. Osborn is a family friend of Spider-Man's secret identity Peter Parker as Osborn's son, Harry Osborn (played by James Franco), is a close friend of Parker. The role required Dafoe to wear an uncomfortable costume and mask that made it impossible to emote using his face, confining Dafoe to convey emotion through his voice and head movements. Dafoe also had to wear a prosthetic teeth for his part as Norman whereas the hallucinations of the character had Dafoe in his natural teeth. Dafoe's role in the film was generally well-received, including a New York Daily News reviewer who felt he put "the scare in archvillain" and Peter Bradshaw of The Guardian who deemed him "strong support". Conversely, critic A. O. Scott wrote that his performance was "uninspired and secondhand". IGN Richard George commented that Green Goblin's armor, particularly the helmet, was "almost comically bad... Not only is it not frightening, it prohibits expression". Steven Scaife at Vice wrote that Dafoe's Goblin "represents everything that’s fun about superhero villains, as well as everything that’s great about Raimi's campy films", also commending Dafoe's voice and body language, which helped overcome the bulky Green Goblin costume that he compared to that of a Power Rangers villain.

Later in 2002, Dafoe starred with Greg Kinnear in Paul Schrader's biographical film Auto Focus, Dafoe's third collaboration with Schrader. Dafoe portrayed John Henry Carpenter, an electronics expert who develops a strange friendship with the actor Bob Crane, leading Crane into a downward spiral. Dafoe provided his voice to the computer-animated Pixar film Finding Nemo in 2003. Dafoe voiced Gill, a moorish idol fish who helps Nemo, a clownfish, in his struggle to return home to the ocean. In the same year, Dafoe appeared in a small but pivotal role as a drug cartel kingpin planning a coup d'état against the President of Mexico in Robert Rodriguez's action film Once Upon a Time in Mexico. The murder mystery The Reckoning was Dafoe's final film of 2003, in which he starred with Paul Bettany. The film takes place during the Middle Ages and saw Dafoe play the leader of acting troupe that recreate the events surrounding a woman accused of witchcraft and murder, who they believe is innocent. Dafoe lent his voice and likeness to the James Bond video game James Bond 007: Everything or Nothing (2004) as the villain Nikolai Diavolo.

The following year, Dafoe took on another villainous role in The Clearing, albeit with a more sympathetic approach. Dafoe co-starred as a man who kidnaps his former boss (played by Robert Redford) in exchange for a ransom. The film received mixed reviews, although Peter Travers felt that he added a note of "vulnerability to the menace he has made his stock in trade". Dafoe reprised his role as Norman Osborn in Spider-Man 2 (2004), appearing to his son Harry in an hallucination. The cameo was suggested by Dafoe, comparing it to the ghost of Hamlet's father visiting his son to ask him to avenge his death. Dafoe was next seen in the comedy-drama The Life Aquatic with Steve Zissou (2004), his first of three films with director Wes Anderson. He played the "hilariously doltish" German first mate of a research vessel owned by the eponymous lead character, who is played by Bill Murray. Dafoe then had a small role as a tabloid magazine editor in Martin Scorsese's The Aviator (2004), a biographical film about Howard Hughes starring Leonardo DiCaprio. Also in 2004, Dafoe narrated the documentary Final Cut: The Making and Unmaking of Heaven's Gate, chronicling the production of Heaven's Gate and co-starred as a neuropharmacologist in the direct-to-video thriller Control (2004) alongside Ray Liotta and Michelle Rodriguez. Dafoe co-starred in XXX: State of the Union (2005), an action film sequel starring Ice Cube in which Dafoe played a US Secretary of Defense attempting a coup d'état against the President of the United States. It was largely panned by critics, although Dafoe stated he did not regret appearing in the film.

With the avant-garde drama Manderlay in 2005, Dafoe began another actor-director collaboration, this time with Danish filmmaker Lars von Trier. Dafoe co-starred in the film as the father of Bryce Dallas Howard's character, a woman who discovers a plantation still thriving as if slavery had never been abolished. Along with his wife Giada Colagrande, Dafoe co-wrote and starred in Before It Had a Name (2005), which Colagrande directed. Dafoe played the caretaker of a house that is inherited by the lover of its deceased owner, engaging in a sexual relationship with her. The film was excoriated by a Variety reviewer as a "wannabe haunted house tale laced with silly sex scenes" and an "embarrassment". His fourth and final film appearance of 2005 was the crime thriller Ripley Under Ground, in which he played a museum curator. Dafoe had a supporting role in Spike Lee's 2006 crime thriller Inside Man, playing a veteran captain of the NYPD Emergency Services Unit helping with a hostage negotiation during a bank heist on Wall Street. Dafoe co-starred as the White House Chief of Staff in American Dreamz, a comedy satirizing both popular entertainment and American politics. His character was described as a "diminutive version of Dick Cheney, with wire-rimmed glasses and a fringe of white hair" by The Times writer Caryn James. He starred with Juliette Binoche in a short film directed by Nobuhiro Suwa as part of the 2006 anthology film Paris, je t'aime.

In 2007, Dafoe played a pretentious film director in the British comedy film Mr. Bean's Holiday, starring Rowan Atkinson as Mr. Bean. The Hollywood Reporter thought that Dafoe appeared to think he was "in a pantomime", while a New York Times reviewer felt he was "amusing" in the role. Dafoe starred as the owner of a strip club in Abel Ferrara's Go Go Tales (2007); Manohla Dargis praised his "twitchy, sympathetic performance" in the film. In the same year, Dafoe voiced the main villain, an evil wizard, in the English dub of the Japanese animated fantasy film Tales from Earthsea, had a supporting role as a US Senator in the drama The Walker, his fourth collaboration with Paul Schrader, and took on the lead role in the psychological thriller Anamorph, in which Dafoe played a detective who notices the case he is investigating bears similarities to a previous case of his. He also reprised his role again as Norman Osborn in Spider-Man 3 (2007) in a brief cameo. Dafoe starred with Ryan Reynolds, Julia Roberts, and Emily Watson in the drama Fireflies in the Garden, which premiered at Berlinale in 2008 but was not released theatrically until 2011. Dafoe played a cold, domineering English professor who has a strained relationship with his family. The film received mostly negative reviews, although the performances were generally praised. Roger Ebert thought that Dafoe was "fearsome" in the role, while Manohla Dargis felt he and Roberts were "awkwardly matched" as a married couple. Dafoe co-starred as SS Nazi officer in Paul Schrader's Adam Resurrected (2008), which starred Jeff Goldblum as a concentration camp internee. In his final release of 2008, Dafoe starred in the Greek drama The Dust of Time as an American film director of Greek descent making a film his mother's (played by Irène Jacob) life. The critic Peter Brunette felt the cast's performances, especially Dafoe's, were unconvincing.

Dafoe appeared in seven films in 2009, the first of which was in Lars von Trier's experimental film Antichrist. Dafoe and Charlotte Gainsbourg played a couple whose relationship becomes increasingly sexually violent and sadomasochistic after retreating to a cabin in the woods following the death of their child. The film received a polarized response from critics and audiences, receiving both applause and boos at the Cannes Film Festival and was called the "most shocking movie" to be shown at the festival because of its graphic sex scenes. Roger Ebert commended Dafoe's and Gainsbourg's performances as being "heroic and fearless". During an interview with L Magazine, it was revealed Dafoe had a stand in for scenes where his character's penis was on screen as his own was too big. Dafoe next had a small role in the French thriller Farewell as the Director of the Central Intelligence Agency and co-starred opposite Michael Shannon in Werner Herzog's My Son, My Son, What Have Ye Done?, in which he played a detective attempting to figure out why a troubled man killed his own mother. Dafoe played a former vampire who has a cure that can save the human species in the science fiction horror film Daybreakers, which starred Ethan Hawke as a vampire hematologist. Richard Corliss of Time magazine wrote that Dafoe "triumphs over some awful dialogue by giving the role his nutsy-greatsy weirdness". Dafoe had a voice role in Wes Anderson's stop-motion animated film Fantastic Mr. Fox starring George Clooney as the titular Roald Dahl character. Fresh Air critic David Edelstein felt Dafoe was one of the film's highlights as a "hep-cat, knife-wielding rat security guard". Dafoe reprised his role from The Boondock Saints in The Boondock Saints II: All Saints Day, making a brief cameo appearance. His final appearance of the year was in Cirque du Freak: The Vampire's Assistant, another film centring around vampires in which Dafoe played the foppish vampire Gavner Purl. Between October and December 2009, Dafoe appeared in Richard Foreman's surrealist play Idiot Savant at The Public Theater.

2010s
Dafoe appeared in two films that premiered at the Venice International Film Festival in 2010, making a brief appearance in Julian Schnabel's political thriller Miral, which some reviewers found to be distracting. and starred in his wife Giada Colagrande's film A Woman. Also in 2010, Dafoe began voicing Clarence, the Birds Eye polar bear mascot in the company's television commercials in the United Kingdom, and narrated Into the Deep: America, Whaling & the World, a Ric Burns documentary about the history of the whaling industry in the United States.

Dafoe's first of two leading roles in 2011 was in Abel Ferrara's apocalyptic drama 4:44 Last Day on Earth, his third film with Ferrara. He played an actor spending his last hours on Earth before the end of the world with his much-younger lover (played by Shanyn Leigh). The film garnered a poor reaction critics, with a reviewer for Paste stating "there's only so much depth [Dafoe] can bring to such a shallow character". Dafoe then starred in the Australian drama The Hunter, playing a professional hunter who travels to Tasmania to hunt down the world's only remaining thylacine. Critic Stephen Holden wrote in his review of the film, "Even in the "toughest, most macho roles... [Dafoe] retains a tinge of Christ-like sweetness and vulnerability". In 2011, Dafoe began narrating a series of television commercials for the Greek yogurt company Fage and starred in a Jim Beam commercial titled "Bold Choices". Dafoe starred alongside Marina Abramović and Gretchen Mol in the play The Life and Death of Marina Abramović, which premiered at The Lowry in 2011. Dafoe played Martian chieftain Tars Tarkas in the Disney film John Carter (2012), using motion capture to portray the multi-limbed character. The film was a box office failure and ranks among the biggest box-office bombs of all time. Later in 2012, Dafoe co-starred in the low-budget crime thriller Tomorrow You're Gone with Stephen Dorff and Michelle Monaghan.

In 2013, Dafoe played a police officer in the supernatural thriller Odd Thomas, starring Anton Yelchin as the titular character that possesses supernatural powers to see the dead. Using motion-capture acting technology, Dafoe co-starred alongside Elliot Page in David Cage's video game Beyond: Two Souls (2013) as a paranormal activity researcher who acts as the surrogate-father-figure to a girl who possesses supernatural powers. The game polarized reviewers, although Dafoe and Page's performance were widely praised. In Scott Cooper's Out of the Furnace (2013), starring Christian Bale, Dafoe played the supporting role of a bookmaker running an illegal gambling operation. Dafoe next appeared in Lars von Trier's two-part erotic art film Nymphomaniac, his third and final film release of 2013. In the film, Dafoe played a perverse businessman who hires Charlotte Gainsbourg's character to work as a debt collector using sex and sadomasochism. Also in 2013, Dafoe played the devil in a Mercedes-Benz Super Bowl commercial and starred in three short student films as part of a competition sponsored by Jameson Irish Whiskey. In 2014, Dafoe portrayed a wealthy private banker with connections to the Russia mafia opposite Philip Seymour Hoffman in Anton Corbijn's espionage thriller A Most Wanted Man. Dafoe worked with Wes Anderson for a third time with the comedy The Grand Budapest Hotel (also 2014), featuring as the henchman of Adrien Brody's character alongside an ensemble cast led by Ralph Fiennes. Dafoe next starred alongside Matt Dillon as a detective in the crime thriller Bad Country, which critic Justin Chang dismissed as being "blandly constructed".

In May 2014, Dafoe served as member of the main competition jury at the 2014 Cannes Film Festival. He was next featured in a supporting role as a mean-spirited, alcoholic author who is visited by a pair of cancer patients, who are played by Shailene Woodley and Ansel Elgort, in the romantic drama The Fault in Our Stars. Dafoe once again collaborated with Ferrara on the drama Pasolini, in which he played Italian filmmaker Pier Paolo Pasolini during his last days before his murder in 1975. Film critic Peter Bradshaw noted the physical similarities between Dafoe and Pasolini, although felt Dafoe had too little screen time in the film. His final film of 2014 was the action thriller John Wick starring Keanu Reeves, in which Dafoe appeared as the mentor to the titular character, a former hitman who is forced out of retirement to seek vengeance for the killing of his puppy. Dafoe stated he found the use of gun fu combat created an interesting mix of action, stating "you have the grace of martial arts, but then the bang of the gun". His performance in the film was generally well received by critics, including Peter Travers who felt he provided "ample compensation". Dafoe made his second guest appearance in the animated sitcom The Simpsons in November 2014, voicing a new school teacher who bullies Bart Simpson profusely. Dafoe starred in the late Brazilian director's Héctor Babenco's final film My Hindu Friend (2015) as a film director close to death who befriends a Hindu 8-year-old boy while hospitalized.

The black comedy Dog Eat Dog (2016), Dafoe's sixth film with Paul Schrader, starred Dafoe and Nicolas Cage as a pair of ex-convicts hired to kidnap a baby. In the same year, Dafoe reprised his voice role as Gill, a Moorish idol fish, from Finding Nemo in its sequel Finding Dory. He next played the boss of Gerard Butler's character in the drama A Family Man and starred in Loris Gréaud's arthouse science fiction film Sculpt, which was only screened at the Los Angeles County Museum of Art for one person at a time. His final film of the year was the monster film The Great Wall, a Chinese-American co-production directed by Zhang Yimou starring Matt Damon as a European mercenary in China defending the Great Wall of China from a horde of monsters, in which Dafoe played a former adventurer working as a teacher in China. Also in 2016, Dafoe appeared in another Super Bowl commercial, this time for Snickers, recreating Marilyn Monroe's iconic white dress scene from the film The Seven Year Itch.

In 2017, Dafoe co-starred in Sean Baker's drama The Florida Project as the manager of a motel in Kissimmee, Florida who houses a toxic mother and her six-year-old daughter. The film and his performance received enormous critical acclaim, with The Washington Post critic Ann Hornaday writing that "Dafoe delivers his finest performance in recent memory, bringing to levelheaded, unsanctimonious life a character who offers a glimmer of hope and caring within a world markedly short on both". Dafoe earned his third Academy Award for Best Supporting Actor nomination, as well as nominations at the Golden Globes, SAG Awards, and BAFTA Awards. In 2017, Dafoe also played and voiced the character of Ryuk, a demonic death god from Japanese mythology, in Netflix's Death Note, and adaptation of the Japanese supernatural-thriller manga of the same name. He then narrated Australian documentarian Jennifer Peedom's documentary Mountain. Also that year, he co-starred as Gerhard Hardman in a film adaptation of Agatha Christie's detective novel Murder on the Orient Express, directed by and starring Kenneth Branagh; and played Atlantean scientist Nuidis Vulko in a deleted role in Zack Snyder's Justice League. He later played Nuidis Vulko in a leading role in James Wan's 2018 film Aquaman. The same year, Dafoe played Vincent van Gogh in the biographical drama At Eternity's Gate, for which he received the Volpi Cup for Best Actor and an Academy Award for Best Actor nomination among other awards and accolades. His performance drew raves from film critics. Peter Keough of Boston Globe said Dafoe "may be the best actor around for expressing an inner life in extremis."

In 2019, he had a supporting role in Edward Norton's period crime drama Motherless Brooklyn where he played powerful developer Moses Randolph's "beaten and broken" brother. In the same year, he played a lighthouse keeper on a storm-swept island in Robert Eggers' psychological horror The Lighthouse opposite Robert Pattinson. It had its world premiere at the Cannes Film Festival, where the film and Dafoe's performance received high praise. Owen Gleiberman of Variety said "Both actors are sensational (and they work together like one), but in terms of sheer showboating power it’s Dafoe’s movie." Dafoe portrayed sled dog breeder, trainer, and musher Leonhard Seppala in Togo.

2020s
Dafoe appears in Wes Anderson's ensemble period comedy The French Dispatch and Guillermo del Toro's neo-noir psychological thriller Nightmare Alley, which were both released in 2021, and Robert Eggers's historical epic The Northman, released in 2022. All projects pushed their release dates due to the COVID-19 pandemic.

Dafoe voiced the Australian ABC-television documentary 'River' in 2022, which was written to highlight the precaricity of rivers worldwide.

In 2020, The New York Times ranked him No. 18 in its list of the 25 Greatest Actors of the 21st Century.

In February 2021, it was announced that Dafoe will be co-starring alongside Emma Stone and Mark Ruffalo in Yorgos Lanthimos's Poor Things.

Dafoe reprised his role as Green Goblin from Sam Raimi's Spider-Man trilogy in the Marvel Cinematic Universe film Spider-Man: No Way Home, released on December 17, 2021. To avoid having his role in the film prematurely revealed, Dafoe wore a cloak on-set to conceal his appearance from being outed publicly. The star of the film, Tom Holland, said that he got scared after bumping into Dafoe by accident one day on set and only then found out about his role in the film. Also, like Alfred Molina (who reprised his role as Otto Octavius/Doctor Octopus in the film), Dafoe was digitally de-aged for the character's 2002 self. 

Upon release of No Way Home, Dafoe's reprisal was met with universal acclaim. The Lantern Brett Price wrote that Dafoe was "on another level" in No Way Home and not having his mask made him even more intimidating than he was in the 2002 film. Peter Travers of Good Morning America and Jade King at The Gamer praised Dafoe and Molina, with King asserting that the two "stole the show as Green Goblin and Doc Ock" and described the depictions as brilliant. Amelia Emberwing of IGN praised the performances of Dafoe, Molina, and Foxx in No Way Home, while Vulture Bilge Ebiri said Dafoe "once again gets to have some modest fun with his character's divided self".

On January 18, 2022, it was announced that Dafoe would host Saturday Night Live on January 29, 2022, with musical guest singer Katy Perry.

The upcoming psychological horror film Inside is set to be released March 10, 2023.

Personal life

In 1977, Dafoe began a relationship with director Elizabeth LeCompte. Their son, Jack, was born in 1982. They separated in 2004 and were never married because "to her, marriage represented ownership".

Dafoe married Italian actress, director, and screenwriter Giada Colagrande on March 25, 2005, a year after the two had met in Rome at the premiere of one of her films. Dafoe said in 2010, "We were having lunch and I said: 'Do you want to get married tomorrow?'" They did so the following afternoon at a small ceremony with two friends as witnesses. The couple worked together on her films Before It Had a Name and A Woman. They divide their time between Rome, New York City, and Los Angeles. He now holds dual American and Italian citizenship.

Dafoe is a pescetarian, believing that "animal farms are one of the main causes of the destruction of the planet". He practices ashtanga yoga every day.

References

External links

 
 
 
 
 Willem Dafoe Biography
 The Onion A.V. Club interview
 

1955 births
Living people
20th-century American male actors
21st-century American male actors
American expatriates in Italy
American male film actors
American male television actors
American male video game actors
American male voice actors
American people of Canadian descent
American people of English descent
American people of French descent
American people of German descent
American people of Irish descent
American people of Scottish descent
Appleton East High School alumni
Audiobook narrators
Best Actor Bodil Award winners
Honorary Golden Bear recipients
Independent Spirit Award for Best Supporting Male winners
Internet memes
Male actors from Wisconsin
People from Appleton, Wisconsin
University of Wisconsin–Milwaukee alumni
Volpi Cup for Best Actor winners